Blue Sky Basin is the most recent expansion to Vail Ski Resort in Colorado in the United States. It is the most debated and controversial ski area expansion in Colorado history. It opened to skiers in 2000 despite conflict about whether the expansion would endanger the lynx, a mountain cat re-introduced into the Colorado wilds.

In response, the largest eco-terrorist attack in the United States occurred at Vail in 1998 - a $12 million incident involving several Vail facilities, including the destruction of the Two Elk restaurant. Authorities believe it was planned by William C. Rodgers and other environmental activists. The FBI launched Operation Backfire, which eventually led to convictions of the arsonists. The incident created sympathy for the resort, if not necessarily for Blue Sky Basin or the corporate owner, Vail Resorts.

Blue Sky Basin offers a more natural ski experience down its  vertical drop, with mostly meadows and glades, rather than wide, clear-cut runs.

External links
Article on Blue Sky Basin
Vail.com
Vail Resorts corporate site

Buildings and structures in Eagle County, Colorado
Vail Resorts
Ski areas and resorts in Colorado
Tourist attractions in Eagle County, Colorado
2000 establishments in Colorado